Icarus Falls is the second solo studio album by English singer-songwriter Zayn. It was released on 14 December 2018, as a double album by RCA Records. 
Originally planned for 2017, the album was delayed so that Zayn could focus on the aesthetic and sound the album would adopt, marking a shift from the visual identity used on his debut studio album, Mind of Mine (2016). Icarus Falls is a concept album influenced by Greek Mythology and Icarus, addressing themes such as self-love, finding yourself again as a person, and hope.

Influenced by the double album structure, Zayn incorporated several sonic elements in addition to R&B, such as pop, funk rock, trap and electropop. He recruited Alan Sampson, MakeYouKnowLove and Malay, who had already worked with Zayn on his previous album, adding Brian Lee, Dan Grech, Timbaland and the duo Saltwives to the production team. Zayn did not promote the album through press interviews and live performances, which he had done on his previous releases. 

Six international singles—"Let Me", "Entertainer, "Sour Diesel", "Too Much" featuring Timbaland, "Fingers", and "No Candle No Light" featuring Nicki Minaj—supported the album; the first peaked at seventy-three on the Billboard Hot 100. "Rainberry" and "Good Years" preceded the album as promotional tracks.

Icarus Falls received generally positive reception from critics, and peaked at 61 on the US Billboard 200 and 77 on the UK Albums Chart. The Japanese version of the album features the previously released singles, "Still Got Time", featuring PartyNextDoor, and "Dusk Till Dawn", featuring Sia. In August 2020, Zayn also added "Still Got Time" featuring PartyNextDoor and "Dusk Till Dawn" featuring Sia to the album tracklist.

Background
Icarus Falls was originally scheduled to be released in 2017. The CEO of RCA Records, Peter Edge, said the album would consist of a "more optimistic tone to it after coming through that more challenging time", referring to Malik's time as a member of One Direction.  In November 2017, Malik stated that the album was "90 percent completed", and would include Timbaland as one of its producers. Speaking about why the album was delayed, Zayn said:  In early 2018, Malik revealed snippets of clips from the album on Instagram, captioned with "Taster z2".
Icarus Falls is a concept album inspired by the Greek myth of Icarus. He recalls the story of Icarus, who flew too close to the sun, and compares it to the ups and downs of his relationship.

Many people assume that Zayn could be using the title as a metaphor for how he feels he "escaped" from One Direction, but the ensuing scrutiny from the media over his relationships and career was too much, and caused him to step away from the spotlight.

Songs
Opening track and lead single "Let Me" is an upbeat pop and R&B track featuring "a slick, easygoing production" as well as "buoyant throwback synths, finger snaps and strumming guitar". Despite there being a censored version of the album, "Common" is still explicit and features the f-word in the track once on the CD format. However, the platform version of the album that features the edited version replaces the f-word with "individual". "There You Are" is an upbeat pop song that was compared to material released during his time in One Direction. 

"Good Guy" opens the second disc of the album. The track interpolates "Bang Bang (My Baby Shot Me Down)", originally released by Cher in 1966, and "swirls with striking atmosphere".

Release and promotion
The album's release was confirmed on 30 November 2018, and released on 14 December 2018.

Singles
"Let Me" was released on 12 April 2018 as the lead single from the album and peaked at number 20 on the UK Singles Chart. "Entertainer" was released as the album's second single on 23 May and peaked at number 95 in the UK. "Sour Diesel" was released as the album's third single on 18 July. "Too Much" featuring Timbaland was released as the album's fourth single on 2 August and charted at number 79 in the UK. "Fingers" was released as the album's fifth single on 18 October. "No Candle No Light" featuring Nicki Minaj was released as the album's sixth single on 15 November.

Promotional singles
"Rainberry" was released as the album's first promotional single on 30 November 2018 after the album became available to pre-order on iTunes. On 6 December, the song "Good Years" was released as the second promotional single. "There You Are" was released on 11 December as the third promotional single from the album.

Other songs
"Still Got Time" featuring PartyNextDoor was released as a single on 24 March 2017 and peaked at number 24 on the UK Singles Chart. "Dusk Till Dawn" featuring Sia was released on 7 September 2017 and peaked at number five on the UK Singles Chart. These songs were included only on the Japanese edition of the album.

A music video for "Satisfaction", directed by Bouha Kazmi, was released on 9 January 2019. It follows the story of a romance that is plagued by the hardships of war. On 29 July 2018, Zayn, via his official Twitter account, released a three minute long cover of Beyoncé's "Me, Myself and I" as a taster for his fans. The cover would go on to have as many as 1.7 million views. 

On 14 April 2019, Malik released the music video for the song "Stand Still".

Critical reception

The album holds an aggregate score of 70 out of 100 on Metacritic based on nine reviews, indicating "generally favorable reviews". In a positive review, Helen Brown of The Independent stated that with "his maturing soulful falsetto, melismatic yearnings that check his heritage, and muzzy, midnight mutterings", listeners "following the shining thread of Malik's voice will be led through winding passages of hope, dope, seduction and evasion."

Madison Spira of Who gave the album a positive review, stating that it is "different to anything we've seen from Zayn before, and that's what makes this album so beautiful" and there "are so many songs I'm convinced most people will relate to on a personal level."

Dhruva Balram of NME called it a "27-track mosaic to be poured over time and again" where Zayn "really strikes upon his potential."

Rea McNamara of Now gave it a "great" rating of 4 out of 5, praising how "Zayn grapples with toxic masculinity" and how it "reminds us that sometimes life's lows help us appreciate love's highs".

Malvika Padin of Clash gave it a favourable review, calling it a "relentlessly creative" album that "begins the journey to realising his full potential".

Neil Yeung of AllMusic stated that, with "his gorgeous voice and a batch of irresistibly seductive gems, he approaches greatness" but criticised the length, concluding that it "deserves some attention if there's time and patience to spare."

Maura Johnston of Pitchfork gave it a favourable review, stating that, while long, it as a fine "high-concept pop album" that "hinges on the idea of excess and its trickery" while referring to Zayn as "a skillful interpreter of pop" and "one of teen idoldom's most enigmatic artists."

Tara Joshi of The Observer gave it a favourable review, stating that, despite "the intimidating length", there is "plenty here to appreciate" such as vocals "pouring forth a gorgeous falsetto" and often channelling "melismatic Bollywood/qawwali-style singing", a "glossy production," and "a variety of styles", concluding that "Malik is defying expectations, remaining in ascent."

Conversely, Consequence of Sounds Wren Graves praised some of the songs and Zayn's vocals but criticised the album as a long "half-baked concept album" that is "repetitive and dull," while Pryor Stroud of Slant Magazine deemed it "bloated" and "forgettable, albeit expertly produced".

Track listing

Notes
  signifies a co-producer
  signifies an additional producer
  signifies a vocal producer
 Khaled Rohaim, MakeYouKnowLove, Saltwives, and Henrique Andrade are also credited as vocal producers for the songs they produced.

Sample credits
 "Good Guy" contains an interpolation of "Bang Bang (My Baby Shot Me Down)" (1966), written by Sonny Bono and originally performed by Cher.

Personnel
Credits adapted from Tidal. Track listing refers to the 2020 digital re-release.

Performers

 Khaled Rohaim – drums 
 Lewis Allen – guitar 
 Michael Hannides – piano , background vocals , drums 
 Saltwives – drums, guitar, keyboards, programming 
 Match Anderson – guitar 
 Anthony Hannides – background vocals 
 Dan McDougall – bass 
 Levi Lennox – drums, piano 
 Alex Al – bass 
 Donnell Spencer, Jr. – drums 
 Vinnie Colaiuta – drums 
 Tim Pierce – guitar 
 Jamie Muhoberac – keyboards 
 Malay – guitar 
 Richard Saunders – background vocals 
 Dave Eggar – cello, strings 
 Taylor Johnson – drums, guitar 
 Phil Faconti – strings 
 Donnie Reis – violin 
 Matt Kirkwood – bass 
 Greg Kurstin – drums, guitar, keyboards, piano, programming 

Technical

 Serban Ghenea – mixing engineer 
 Erik Madrid – mixing engineer 
 Khaled Rohaim – mixing engineer 
 Manny Marroquin – mixing engineer 
 Chris Galland – mixing engineer 
 Dan Grech-Marguerat – mixing engineer 
 Saltwives – mixing engineer , engineer, recording engineer 
 Josh Gudwin – mixing engineer 
 Vinnie Colaiuta – mixing engineer 
 James F. Reynolds – mixing engineer 
 Jaycen Joshua – mixing engineer 
 John Haynes – engineer 
 Zeke Mishanec – engineer , assistant engineer 
 Beatriz Artola – engineer 
 John Francis Meehan – engineer 
 Daryl "D-Zone" Johnson – engineer 
 Alex Pasco – engineer 
 Greg Kurstin – engineer 
 Julian Burg – engineer 
 Malay – recording engineer 
 Paul Norris – recording engineer , assistant engineer 
 Henrique Andrade – recording engineer 
 Rob Marks – recording engineer 
 Richard Saunders – recording engineer 
 Aubry "Big Juice" Delaine – recording engineer 
 Brian Lee – recording engineer 
 Sawyr – recording engineer 
 Tushar Apte – recording engineer 
 William Binderup – assistant engineer 
 Jack Thomason – assistant engineer 
 Robin Florent – assistant engineer 
 Scott Desmarais – assistant engineer 
 Pier Giacalone – assistant engineer 
 Hunter Jackson – assistant engineer 
 Matthew Sim – assistant engineer 
 Ludovick Tartavel – assistant engineer 
 Brian Judd – assistant engineer 
 David Nakaji – assistant engineer 
 Ivan Jimenez – assistant engineer 
 Nick Valentin – assistant engineer 
 Jacob Richards – assistant engineer 
 Michael Seaberg – assistant engineer 
 Rashawn Mclean – assistant engineer 
 Jamie Peters – assistant engineer 
 Loren McLean – assistant engineer

Charts

Certifications

Release history

References
Footnotes

Citations

2018 albums
Albums produced by Frank Dukes
Albums produced by Greg Kurstin
Albums produced by Malay (record producer)
Albums produced by Murda Beatz
Albums produced by Timbaland
Concept albums
Classical mythology in music
RCA Records albums
Zayn Malik albums